Swing is a 1999 musical comedy romance film directed by Nick Mead and starring Hugo Speer and Lisa Stansfield. This was Stansfield's film debut and she also recorded the soundtrack, Swing. Jimmy Nail was originally cast, but does not feature in the film. The film was produced by Su Lim and Louise Rosner, with Donald Kushner, Peter Locke, Robert L. Levy, Peter Abrams and Jean-Pierre Guérin as executive producers.

Plot

Cast

Music

Reception 
AllMovie critic Buzz McClain gave the film a 2 out of 5, calling it "a terrific film, full of life and joy and excellent music, but with an uncharacteristically somber finale". Review aggregator Rotten Tomatoes has the film at 43% based on 7 reviews with an average rating of 4.64/10.

References

External links 

1999 films
1999 musical films
1999 comedy films
British independent films
Films set in Liverpool
Jazz films
1990s English-language films
1990s British films